Cross stitches in embroidery, needlepoint, and other forms of needlework include a number of related stitches in which the thread is sewn in an x or + shape. Cross stitch has been called "probably the most widely used stitch of all" and is part of the needlework traditions of the Balkans, Middle East, Afghanistan, Colonial America and Victorian England.

Applications

Cross stitches were typical of 16th century canvas work, falling out of fashion in favor of tent stitch toward the end of the century.  Canvas work in cross stitch became popular again in the mid-19th century with the Berlin wool work craze.

Herringbone, fishbone, Van Dyke, and related crossed stitches are used in crewel embroidery, especially to add texture to stems, leaves, and similar objects. Basic cross stitch is used to fill backgrounds in Assisi work.

Cross stitch was widely used to mark household linens in the 18th and 19th centuries, and girls' skills in this essential task were demonstrated with elaborate samplers embroidered with cross-stitched alphabets, numbers, birds and other animals, and the crowns and coronets sewn onto the linens of the nobility.  Much of contemporary cross-stitch embroidery derives from this tradition.

Variants
Common variants of cross stitch include:

Basic cross stitch
Long-armed cross stitch
Double cross stitch
Italian cross stitch
Basket stitch
Leaf stitch
Herringbone stitch
Closed herringbone stitch
Tacked herringbone stitch
Threaded herringbone stitch
Tied herringbone stitch
Montenegrin stitch
Trellis stitch
Thorn stitch
Van Dyke stitch

Gallery

See also

Cross-stitch
Embroidery stitch

Notes

References

Caulfield, S.F.A., and B.C. Saward, The Dictionary of Needlework, 1885.
Enthoven, Jacqueline: The Creative Stitches of Embroidery, Van Norstrand Rheinhold, 1964, 
Reader's Digest, Complete Guide to Needlework. The Reader's Digest Association, Inc. (March 1992). 
Lemon, Jane, Metal Thread Embroidery, Sterling, 2004, p. 112
Levey, S. M. and D. King, The Victoria and Albert Museum's Textile Collection Vol. 3: Embroidery in Britain from 1200 to 1750, Victoria and Albert Museum, 1993, 

Embroidery stitches

pl:Haft krzyżykowy